In Nagaland, there are 81 empanelled general hospitals (64 public and 17 private).

List of hospitals in Nagaland

Kohima Metropolitan Area
Public
 Naga Hospital Authority
 Nagaland Medical College

Private
 Bethel Medical Center
 KOHIMAS Hospital
 KP Bethesda Hospital
 Oking Hospital and Research Clinic

Chümoukedima Metropolitan Area
Private
 Christian Institute of Health Sciences and Research (Referral Hospital)

Dimapur Metropolitan Area
Public
 Dimapur District Hospital

Private
 Eden Medical Centre
 Faith Hospital
 Metro Hospital
 Nikos Hospital
 Olive Christian Hospital and Research Centre
 Zion Hospital and Research Centre

References

Hospitals in Nagaland
Hospitals
Nagaland
Lists of hospitals in India